This is a list of Portuguese television related events from 1992.

Events
6 October - Sociedade Independente de Comunicação, Portugal's first private television channel, begins transmission.

Debuts

International
/ Where's Wally? (RTP1)

Television shows

1990s
Roda da Sorte (1990-1994, 2008)

Ending this year

Births

Deaths